Mary Crane may refer to:

 Mary Crane, one of the Conservative Party of Canada candidates, 2008 Canadian federal election#Malpeque
 Mary Helen Peck Crane (1827–1891), activist, writer; mother of Stephen Crane

In fiction
 Mary Crane, a character in the novel Psycho
 Mary Crane, character in The Voyage

See also 
 Crane (surname)